Secreted frizzled-related protein 2 is a protein that in humans is encoded by the SFRP2 gene.
This gene encodes a member of the SFRP family that contains a cysteine-rich domain homologous to the putative Wnt-binding site of Frizzled proteins. SFRPs act as soluble modulators of Wnt signaling. Methylation of this gene is a potential marker for the presence of colorectal cancer.

New cardiomyocytes can be regenerated in the mouse heart via Sfrp2 and this may lead to treatment of heart injury .

Cancer
SFRP2 gene has been detected progressively overexpressed in Human papillomavirus-positive neoplastic keratinocytes derived from uterine cervical preneoplastic lesions at different levels of malignancy. For this reason, this gene is likely to be associated with tumorigenesis and may be a potential prognostic marker for uterine cervical preneoplastic lesions progression.

References

Further reading